Belver de Cinca is a municipality located in the province of Huesca, Aragon, Spain. According to the 2004 census (INE), the municipality has a population of 1,375 inhabitants.

Notable people
Felipe Alaiz (1887–1959), writer and translator
Francisco Antonio Cosme Bueno (1711-1798), physician and scientist who spent most of his life in the Viceroyalty of Peru

References

See also
Bajo Cinca/Baix Cinca

Municipalities in the Province of Huesca